Sir James Haldane Stewart Lockhart,  (25 May 1858 – 26 February 1937) was a British colonial official in Hong Kong and China for more than 40 years. He also served as Commissioner of British Weihaiwei from 1902 to 1921.  Additionally, he was a Sinologist who made pioneering translations.

Early life
Born as James Haldane Lockhart in Ardsheal, Argyllshire, Scotland, his parents were Anna Rebecca Charlotte (Stewart) and Miles Lockhart of Lismore, Argyll. His grandfather was banker James Lockhart. He attended King William's College (1868–72), George Watson's College, and the University of Edinburgh, and attempted to enter the civil service in India. Failing to do that, Lockhart took a Colonial Service cadetship in Hong Kong in 1878.

Colonial service in Hong Kong
After joining the Hong Kong Government in 1882, Lockhart rose through the ranks of Hong Kong's civil service. He was Registrar General and Colonial Secretary of Hong Kong, and later became Commissioner of Weihaiwei (1902–1927), the British coastal enclave returned to China in 1930. He had a more positive relationship with Hong Kong Chinese due to this knowledge of Cantonese and was friends with Ho Kai. Lockhart was made a member of the Hong Kong Legislative and Executive Councils.

Lockhart drafted the first English-language report on the New Territories after London's acquisition in 1898. He argued that the prevalent Chinese communal culture and organization would serve as a stabilizing force in the colony. Lockhart's preference for indirect and indigenized rule was a main factor leading to the official recognition of Chinese community organizations like Tung Wah Hospital and Po Leung Kuk. 

He founded the Hong Kong Football Club in 1886, situated within the Happy Valley Racecourse. The club now plays host to the Hong Kong 10s rugby tournament.

Sinological service
While they were both training in Hong Kong, Lockhart became friends with Reginald Johnston, who made his reputation while serving in Weihaiwei. Both men devoted great energy to their studies of Chinese language and classical literature, and both published scholarly works. Johnston was also a great emotional support to Lockhart and his family.  

Johnston later wrote that, as  Lockhart had had a sound training in Greek and Latin at Edinburgh University, he took easily to the study of Chinese, another classical language. The China Review, a journal for scholarly work by China coast foreigners, published Lockhart's early work, which mainly concerned linguistic questions. Lockhart was fluent in Cantonese, Johnston reported, and acquired a working knowledge of Mandarin when he was posted to Weihaiwei.

Numismatics and art collecting
Lockhart was particularly interested in collecting and studying Chinese coins, and he produced several publications on numismatics. He also made a thorough study of Chinese art and literature, and formed a large collection of paintings, ink rubbings and decorative arts, some of which was displayed in 1928.

The collection was donated by his daughter, Betty Joel, to his alma mater, George Watson's College, and is currently on a long-term loan to the National Museum of Scotland. Lockhart's Chinese books were purchased by Cambridge University Library; his photographs are on loan to the Scottish National Portrait Gallery.

Later life
After retiring from the Colonial Service, Lockhart returned to Britain. He became an honorary member of the Royal Asiatic Society and member of the School of Oriental Studies at the University of London.

Honours and legacy
His appointment of CMG was signed by Queen Victoria on 21 May 1898, while his appointment of KCMG was signed by King Edward VII on 9 November 1908. He received an honorary LLD degree from the University of Hong Kong in 1918.

Lockhart Road in Wan Chai, Hong Kong Island, is named after him.

Family
In 1889, Lockhart married Edith Louise Rider Hancock. They had one son and two daughters: Charles, Mary (known by her married and professional name Betty Joel), and Margaret. He returned with his family to England in 1927 and died in London in 1937.

Notes 
Footnotes

Citations

Selected publications
 Lockhart, James H. Stewart (1893). A Manual of Chinese Quotations, Being a Translation of the Ch'êng Yü K'ao. Hong Kong: Kelly & Walsh.

References

Edinburgh City Art Centre (1982). An Ardent Collector: An Exhibition of the Stewart Lockhart Collection. .
 
 Sonia Lightfoot (2008). The Chinese painting collection and correspondence of Sir James Stewart Lockhart (1858-1937). E. Mellen Press. .
 "Sir James Haldane Stewart Lockhart: Colonial Civil Servant and Scholar," 

1858 births
1937 deaths
British Weihaiwei people
Stewart-Lockhart, James Haldane
Knights Commander of the Order of St Michael and St George
People educated at George Watson's College
People educated at King William's College
People from Argyll and Bute
Scottish expatriates in Hong Kong
British sinologists
British numismatists
Chinese numismatics